The Bahawalpur women's cricket team is the women's representative cricket team for Bahawalpur. They competed in the National Women's Cricket Championship between 2012–13 and 2017.

History
Bahawalpur joined the National Women's Cricket Championship in 2012–13, finishing bottom of Pool B Group 1. The side went on to compete in every subsequent edition of the National Women's Cricket Championship until it ended in 2017, with their best performance coming in 2016, when they qualified for the Super League round of the competition after finishing second in Pool B.

Seasons

National Women's Cricket Championship

Honours
 National Women's Cricket Championship:
 Winners (0):
 Best finish: 6th (2016)

See also
 Bahawalpur cricket team

References

Women's cricket teams in Pakistan